A total solar eclipse will take place at the Moon's ascending node on Monday, April 8, 2024, visible across North America and dubbed the Great North American Eclipse (also Great American Total Solar Eclipse and Great American Eclipse) by some of the media. A solar eclipse occurs when the Moon passes between Earth and the Sun, thereby obscuring the image of the Sun for a viewer on Earth.  A total solar eclipse occurs when the Moon's apparent diameter is larger than the Sun's, blocking all direct sunlight, turning day into darkness.  Totality occurs only in a narrow path across Earth's surface, with the partial solar eclipse visible over a surrounding region thousands of kilometres wide.

Occurring only one day after perigee (perigee on April 7, 2024), the Moon's apparent diameter will be larger than usual. With a magnitude of 1.0566, its longest duration of totality will be of four minutes and 28.13 seconds near the town of Nazas, Durango, Mexico (~6 km north), and the nearby city of Torreón, Coahuila.

This eclipse will be the first total solar eclipse to be visible in Canada since February 26, 1979, the first in Mexico since July 11, 1991, and the first in the U.S. since August 21, 2017. It will be the only total solar eclipse in the 21st century where totality will be visible in the three-state set of Mexico, the United States, and Canada.

The next solar eclipse occurs October 2, 2024.

Visibility 

Totality will be visible in a narrow strip in North America, beginning at the Pacific coast, then ascending in a northeasterly direction through Mexico, the United States, and Canada, before ending in the Atlantic Ocean.

Mexico 
In Mexico, totality will pass through the states of Sinaloa (including Mazatlán), Durango (including Durango and Gómez Palacio) and Coahuila (including Torreón, Matamoros, Monclova, Sabinas, Ciudad Acuña and Piedras Negras).

United States 
In the United States, totality will be visible through the states of Texas (including parts of San Antonio, Austin, and Fort Worth and all of Arlington, Dallas, Killeen, Temple, Texarkana, Tyler and Waco), Oklahoma, Arkansas (including Hot Springs, Searcy, Jonesboro, and Little Rock), Missouri, Illinois (including Carbondale, where it intersects the path of the 2017 eclipse), Kentucky, Indiana (including Bloomington, Evansville, Indianapolis, Muncie, Terre Haute, and Vincennes), Ohio (including Akron, Dayton, Lima, Roundhead, Toledo, Oak Harbor,  Cleveland, Warren, Newton Falls and Austintown), Michigan (extreme southeastern corner of Monroe County), Pennsylvania (including Erie), Upstate New York (including Buffalo, Niagara Falls, Rochester, Syracuse, the Adirondacks, Potsdam, and Plattsburgh), and northern Vermont (including Burlington), New Hampshire, and Maine, with the line of totality going almost directly over the state's highest point Mount Katahdin. The largest city entirely in the path will be Dallas, Texas. It will be the second total eclipse visible from the central United States in just 7 years, after the eclipse of August 21, 2017 (see "Related Eclipses", below). Totality will pass through the town of Wapakoneta, Ohio, home of Neil Armstrong, the first person to set foot upon the Moon. This will be the last total solar eclipse visible in the contiguous United States until August 23, 2044.

 Texas
 Harper, Texas: UBarU Camp and Retreat Center April 6–9, 2024.
 Waco, Texas: A website has been made but events are still being planned, April 8–9, 2024.
 Mineola, Texas: Eclipse, Texas Festival, April 6–8.
 Del Valle, Texas: Live Oak Brewing Company will host an event from April 8, 2024, 1 PM EDT to April 9, 2024, 4 AM EDT.
 Arkansas
 De Queen, Arkansas: Sevier County Weekend Festival, Dates still being planned.
 Mena, Arkansas: Blue Zip Line & Farm, April 6–8.
 Hot Springs, Arkansas: Mid-America Science Museum, April 8.
 Clinton, Arkansas: A website has been made but events and dates are still being planned.
 Marshall, Arkansas: A website has been made but events and dates are still being planned.
 Eureka Springs, Arkansas: A website has been made but events and dates are still being planned.
 Illinois
 Chester, Illinois: A website has been made but events and dates are still being planned.
 Carbondale, Illinois: Southern Illinois University has made a website, but events and dates are still being planned.
 Benton, Illinois: A website has been made but events and dates are still being planned.
 Kentucky
 Henderson, Kentucky: A website has been made but events and dates are still being planned.
 Indiana
 Vincennes, Indiana: A website has been made but events are still being planned. Scheduled for April 7.
 French Lick and West Baden, Indiana: A website has been made but events are still being planned. Scheduled for April 8.
 Bloomington, Indiana: Festivities, including live performances, art, poetry, special guests, and trivia competitions are planned. Scheduled for April 8.
 New Castle, Indiana: New Castle Motorsports Park is planning an event on April 8, 2024.
 Ohio
 Dayton, Ohio: Events are planned.
 Forest, Ohio: A website has been made but events are still being planned. Scheduled for April 8, 2024.
 Cleveland, Ohio: The Rock and Roll Hall of Fame is planning the 2024 Total Eclipse of the HeartLAND event on April 8, 2024, from 12:00 EDT to 3:55 pm EDT.
 Wapakoneta, Ohio: Being the hometown of Apollo 11 astronaut Neil Armstrong, the city and Armstrong Air & Space Museum are planning activities, events, and watch parties.
 New York
 Buffalo, New York: A website has been made but events and dates are still being planned.
 Rochester, New York: A website has been made but events and dates are still being planned with the Rochester Museum & Science Center, the Strasenburgh Planentarium, and the Cumming Nature Center.
 Sackets Harbor, New York: Events are being planned with updates to be found on the Chamber of Commerce website.
 Maine
 Millinocket, Maine: Millinockeclipse is a footrace where runners will start when the eclipse begins and stops when the eclipse ends. Whoever runs the farthest wins. Scheduled for April 8, 2:20:53 pm EDT.
 Connecticut
 New Haven, Connecticut: Yale University Leitner Family Observatory & Planetarium will host a viewing event on April 8, 2024.

Canada 
In Canada, the path of totality will pass over parts of Southern Ontario (including Leamington, Hamilton, Niagara Falls, Kingston, Prince Edward County, and Cornwall), parts of southern Quebec (including Montreal, Sherbrooke, Saint-Georges and Lac-Mégantic), central New Brunswick (including Fredericton and Miramichi), western Prince Edward Island (including Tignish and Summerside), the northern tip of Cape Breton Island, Nova Scotia, and central Newfoundland (including Gander and Grand Falls-Windsor). Then, it will vanish on the eastern Atlantic coast of Newfoundland. (Some of the Canadian cities listed, such as Hamilton and Montreal, are on an edge of the path of totality. Windsor, London, Toronto and Ottawa lie just north of the path of totality, and Moncton lies just south of it.)

Europe 
The eclipse will be partially seen in Svalbard (Norway), in Iceland, Ireland, west parts of Great Britain, north-west parts of Spain and Portugal, the Azores and Canary Islands.

Americas 
The eclipse will be partially seen in all Central America countries, from Belize to Panama, and in all Greater Antilles (Cuba, Dominican Republic, Haiti, Puerto Rico and Jamaica).

Related eclipses 
The path of this eclipse will cross the path of the prior total solar eclipse of August 21, 2017, with the intersection of the two paths being in southern Illinois, in Makanda, just south of Carbondale. The cities of Benton, Carbondale, Chester, Harrisburg, Marion, and Metropolis in Illinois; Cape Girardeau, Farmington, and Perryville in Missouri, as well as Paducah, Kentucky, will be within a roughly  intersection of the paths of totality of both the 2017 and 2024 eclipses, therefore earning the distinction of being witness to two total solar eclipses within a span of seven years.

Eclipses of 2024 
 A penumbral lunar eclipse on March 25.
 A total solar eclipse on April 8.
 A partial lunar eclipse on September 18.
 An annular solar eclipse on October 2.

Solar eclipses 2022–2025

Saros 139

Tritos series

Metonic series

Other solar eclipses crossing the United States 

Notable total and annular solar eclipse crossing the United States in the 20th century:

Notable total and annular solar eclipse crossing the United States in the 21st century:

See also 
List of solar eclipses in the 21st century

References

External links 
 2024 Total Solar Eclipse – CNN
 Average cloud coverage during total eclipse of 2024-04-08: Canada US Mexico
 Besselian Elements for the Total Solar Eclipse of 2024 Apr 08
 Hermit Eclipse: Total Solar Eclipse April 8, 2024
 Information on the 2024 total solar eclipse for every community!
 National Eclipse
 NationalEclipse.com An educational site launched for the 2024 eclipse with overviews, maps, city data, events, animations, merchandise, historical information, and other resources.
 Solar Eclipse 2024, 2023, 2021, Eclipse Glasses Information about the 2024 eclipse, including maps, city data, events, animations, and an interactive Google Map providing custom eclipse information.

2024 04 08
2024 04 08
2024 04 08
2024 in science
2024 in North America